HMS Arethusa was a 46-gun  fifth-rate frigate built for the Royal Navy during the 1810s. The ship was never commissioned and was converted into a lazarette (quarantine ship) in 1836. She was renamed HMS Bacchus in 1844 and was further converted into a coal hulk in 1851–52. The ship was sold for scrap in 1883.

Description
The ship's tonnage was 1084  tons burthen. The Leda-class frigates were armed with twenty-eight 18-pounder cannon on her gundeck, fourteen 32-pounder carronades on her quarterdeck and a pair of 9-pounder cannon and two more 32-pounder carronades in forecastle. The ship had a crew of 315 officers and ratings.

Construction and career

Arethusa, the fourth ship of her name to serve in the Royal Navy, was ordered on 22 November 1812, laid down in February 1815 at Pembroke Dockyard, Wales, and launched on 29 July 1817. She sailed for Plymouth Dockyard on 21 August 1817 and was completed for ordinary on 27 September at the cost of £25,923. The ship was never on active duty and was converted for service as a lazarette for Liverpool in April–June 1836. Arethusa was renamed HMS Bacchus on 12 March 1844 to release her name for the large frigate being built and converted into a coal hulk in 1851–52. The ship was sold to Castle & Sons for £1,450 on 14 August 1883 to be broken up.

Notes

References
 
 
 
 
 

 

Leda-class frigates
1817 ships
Ships built in Pembroke Dock